French Island (Boonwurrung: Bellarmarin, Woone, or Jouap) is the largest coastal island of Victoria, Australia, located in Western Port,  southeast of Melbourne. In 1997, about 70% of the island was declared the French Island National Park, administered by Parks Victoria, and was listed in the former Register of the National Estate in 1984. The island is an unincorporated area under the direct administration of the government of Victoria, and is a declared locality of Victoria having its own postcode. Community issues are dealt by the French Island Community Association. The island is otherwise administered by the Department of Transport (Victoria). The population of the island in 2011 was around 116 people, of which about 60 were permanent residents. By 2021 the population on census night was recorded as 139 with a median age of 52 years.

French Island is relatively isolated and underdeveloped. There are no water mains, electricity mains, or medical services on the island. Many of the locals actively promote environmental tourism. Visitor accommodation includes camping, bed and breakfast, guesthouse and farmstay.

History
According to the French Island Community Association, prior to British colonisation, French Island was a hunting ground of the Bunurong people. They lived on the mainland and travelled to French Island to collect shellfish and swan eggs. There are several registered sites on the island that consist of shell middens and stone scatters they left behind.

In April 1802, a French expedition ship Naturaliste under Jacques Hamelin, part of the Baudin expedition to Australia, explored the area. Hamelin named the island Île de Françoise  (Island of Francoise), which was corrupted as French Island.

The first recorded colonial settlers on the island were William and John Gardiner in 1847, who had the first pastoral lease and grazed 8,000 sheep. The first land subdivision was in 1867 when 4733 acres were divided into 14 allotments. The first land sales took place in 1873 with the minimum price £1 per acre. In the 1880s, koalas were introduced to the island.

During the 1890s depression, the government encouraged settlement of the area and established seven village settlements on French Island under the Village Settlement Scheme. These were called Energy, Star of Hope, Callanan's, Perseverance, Industrial, Kiernan's and Grant Homestead Association. Altogether about 200 people made up these settlements. Tankerton Post Office opened on 3 September 1890 and remained open until 1994. It reopened in 2001 under the name French Island. A Fairhaven post office was also open from 1911 until 1957.Four schools were built of which the Perseverance Primary School, established in 1896, is the only one remaining and now caters for only a small number of primary school children.

John Ratford introduced chicory to the island, after he spent a season learning about it on Phillip Island in 1895. The Chicory industry became the main source of income on the island for over 70 years with extensive chicory planting and some 30 chicory kilns established. The Bayview chicory kiln, the second and now the oldest remaining on the island, was built in 1896-97 and is currently a cafe and museum.

McLeod prison farm opened on 17 July 1916 and occupied 222 hectares and operated as a self-sustaining farm. Timber cabins housed the prisoners until 1946 when concrete cells were built. The prison closed in 1975 and was used as a holiday camp facility until 1995. Most recently it operated as an eco-village until it was bought in 2017 for $4 million by a Chinese-based company with plans to turn it into a major tourism operation.

In 1967, at the request of then state Premier Henry Bolte, the State Electricity Commission of Victoria proposed the island as the site of the first nuclear power plant in Australia but the plans were abandoned. During the 1960s and 1970s BHP, Hooker Rex and the State Electricity Commission paid inflated prices for land, inducing land owners to sell up and move off the island.

In July 1997, about 70%, of the island was declared French Island National Park, and in May 2002 the waters directly north of French Island were declared the French Island Marine National Park.

Access and transport
Access to the island is by the Western Port Ferries passenger ferry running daily from Stony Point pier to Tankerton Jetty. Metro Trains run a service to Frankston with an additional diesel service to Stony Point railway station for the cost of a standard metro ticket. Some trains arriving at Stony Point connect with the ferry service to both French Island and Phillip Island throughout the day. The ferry does not carry vehicles; however, ample parking is provided at the Stony Point Foreshore. The crossing takes about 15 minutes. Western Port Ferries also provide a passenger ferry service to French Island from Cowes on Phillip Island.

There is no airport on the island, although a few properties have private landing strips.

There are more than 40 km of unsealed gravel roads and tracks on the island, which are quiet and ideal for mountain bikes. They are affected by rain and can become dangerous for the inexperienced. The island is generally flat or mildly undulating with the highest point being Mount Wellington (96 m above sea level). Bicycles and cars can be hired from the general store. There is an abundance of walking tracks. Active pursuits include bushwalking, bird watching, horse riding, geocaching and cycling. There is one tour operator on the island, French Island Tours.

The French Island Barge Company operates a vehicular ferry from Corinella on the eastern side of Western Port to the barge landing on French Island. It accommodates two standard size cars or a larger truck. Tourists are always welcome. All supplies to the island come by the French Island Barge, which runs every day of the year, depending on tide and appointments.

Geography

French Island has a few notable landforms, including:

 Mount Wellington – highest point on the island at about 96 m
 The Pinnacles – 66 m
 Harrop Hill
 Tortoise Head
 Spit Point

Watercourses on the island include:

 Tankerton Creek
 Redbill Creek
 Mosquito Creek
 Brella Creek

Tankerton is the only community on the island, and is the only place where necessities like food and cars can be bought and rented on the island.

Population
At the 2016 census the French Island population consisted of 119 people, 53% of which were male and 47% of which were female. The median age was 56.

The island has a Primary School, on The Centre Way. In 2003 ten students were enrolled at the Perseverance Primary School.
In 2009 five students were enrolled at the primary school. According to ACARA, in 2011 there were nine enrolments In 2018, Perseverance Primary had seven students taught by one teacher and a teacher's aide.

Natural environment

Habitats range from coastal mangroves, swamps, heath, grasslands and blue gum forests. Most koala populations on the mainland of Australia are affected by the chlamydia disease; however French Island provides the world's densest and most disease-free population of koalas, with regular transfer of excess koalas to repopulate diseased areas on the mainland. Shelter is provided for more than 100 species of bush orchids, and 260 species of birds. Significant species on the island include: king quail, the critically endangered orange-bellied parrot, fairy tern, white-bellied sea eagle, swamp skink, long-nosed potoroo.

The island is one of only two places in Victoria where the invasive red fox is not present, which has enabled the island to maintain a variety of indigenous species which have been devastated by the predator elsewhere including Phillip Island. However rabbits, feral cats, feral goats, feral pigs, Indian mynahs and starlings pose a threat to the island's biodiversity.

Camping
There is one free camping site in the National Park at Fairhaven, 4 km up the coast road from Tankerton Jetty, where the ferry arrives from Stony Point. The camp site is set among trees near the beach, with one public toilet and a water tank. Other camping is available at "private sites" at French Island Eco Inn and through the local French Island tour operator.

Proposed nuclear power plant site
The plant was speculated to have 350-500MW generator capacity and would likely have been built during the 1970s. Other plants around Australia were also envisioned after the construction of a successful, fully operational plant in Victoria. If the SEC did decide to construct a nuclear power station, it would have continued to construct brown coal power stations as well for some considerable time.

Due to the low cost of brown coal in Victoria and mounting pressure from the anti-nuclear movement, the SEC subsequently decided against commissioning a nuclear plant and instead continued the commissioning of brown coal plants. These included the Hazelwood Power Station, which was completed in 1971. Nuclear plants were not constructed in NSW as access to black coal allowed for bigger generators. The declaration of various areas of many Australian states as nuclear free zones was a key factor in the selection of coal plants over nuclear plants.

The land acquired by the State Electrical Commission in the 1960s was subsequently subdivided and sold off in the 1990s during a time when ferry services to the island had become unreliable, with the two small vessels (King Fisher and Port Hunter) breaking down regularly. This drove the government to sell the land for significantly less than they had purchased it for in the 1960s, with land being sold in 60 and 90 acre allotments for just $1,000 per acre.

See also
 Elizabeth Island (Victoria)
 Sandstone Island
 Mornington Peninsula and Western Port Biosphere Reserve

References

External links

 French Island Community Association
 National Park page at Parks Victoria

Unincorporated areas of Victoria (Australia)
Islands of Victoria (Australia)
Towns in Victoria (Australia)
Western Port
Mornington Peninsula
Victorian places listed on the defunct Register of the National Estate